William Walker (1704 – 1761) was the principal of New Inn Hall and the president of St John's College, Oxford.

Education
He was educated at John Roysse's Free School in Abingdon, (now Abingdon School) until c.1719.

Matriculation at St John's College, Oxford (3 July 1719), Bachelor of Civil Law (1726), Doctor of Canon Law (1736).

Career
He was the Principal of New Inn Hall from 1745 until 1761 and the President of St. John's College, Oxford from 26 July 1757 until 30 November 1757 when he resigned and returned to New Inn Hall. Both positions (Principal and President) were the positions of Head of the College.

He was rector of Barnsley, Gloucestershire (1744-1761) and Tackley (1743-1761). Walker was a Steward of the Old Abingdonian Club in 1749.

See also
 List of Old Abingdonians
 List of presidents of St John's College, Oxford

References

1704 births
1761 deaths
People educated at Abingdon School
Principals of New Inn Hall, Oxford
Presidents of St John's College, Oxford